Juliaca (Quechua and ) is the capital of San Román Province in the Puno Region of southeastern Peru. It is the region's largest city with a population of 276,110 inhabitants (2017). It is the largest trade center in the Puno region.

Juliaca is near Lake Chacas, the Maravillas river, and near the ruins of Sillustani.

The city hosts Juliaca's Carnival each year between February and March. During this very popular event participants, dressed in colorful costumes, gather on the streets to dance in the style of the Collao Plateau. Saint Sebastian's feast is celebrated on 20 January of every year.

Juliaca's citizens rely on cars, trains, and bicycles. It is a major transit point in the region and has strong ties with Peru's southern cities, including Arequipa, Puno, Tacna, Cuzco, Ilo, and with La Rinconada and Bolivia.

Like Chicago, Illinois, it is nicknamed "The Windy City", in its case, because of the city's location on the windy Collao Plateau. It is also called the "Sock City" or "Knitting City" because Juliaca was a major center of sock, sweater, and handicraft production. Now the production of clothes, wool and fabrics are industrial processes.

It is also home to Inca Manco Capac Airport, the region's main airport.

Etymology
The historian Ramon Rios argues that Juliaca comes from the Quechua words Xullaskca kaipi (it had drizzled) in allusion that when the Inca troops arrived at this part of the Altiplano chasing the collas, they noticed that in the Huaynarroque hill it had drizzled.

However, Justo Ruelas affirms that Juliaca comes from the Quechua word Shulla Qaqa (roquedal dew), due to the fact that in the vicinity of the Huaynarroque and Santa Cruz hills, small quartz particles can be seen, which resembles the morning dew that falls on rocks.

History

Pre-Spanish arrival
The Altiplano was inhabited from around 4,000 BC by sedentary communities dedicated to agriculture and livestock (llamas and guinea pigs).

The Uros settled in the river towns, taking advantage of the benefits of the totora and the fish of Lake Titicaca, settled in the surrounding lakes: Chacas, Qoriwata, Cochapampa, and the Juliaca River, today Coata River.

The constitution of these settlers were registered as Uros de Coata and Uros de Desaguadero, from where the Uros of Coata would be better communicated and related to Juliaca, by the river that linked them, also these riverine settlers developed a sailing technique, on rafts made of totora, fastened with yarned ropes based on the ichus, which would serve as support for fishing, and at times, of transport from Lake Titicaca to the smaller lakes that were between the territories of Juliaca.

Between the years 1000 to 500 BC, Juliaca flourished under the influence of Qaluyo (ancient settlement), in the place of Qomer Moqo (Taparachi). Archaeologists discovered a small village dating back to this time, whose settlers were fed with potatoes, quinoa, kañiwa, carachi, guinea pig, among others. They were the first builders of waruwarus and developed a special textile industry.

In the years 200 BC to 200 AD, the domain of the Pukara culture expanded in this region of the highlands. Between the third and fourth centuries, the Huaynarroque tribe flourished. Subsequently, the hegemony of Tiahuanaco, Colla and Inka arises consecutively. The kollas and Inka were ruthless rivals and only under the military command of Pachacútec and his son Mayta Capac were able to subdue the brave Sapana, Chuchicápac and Huaynarroque tribes after bloody wars of conquest.

21st century
During a political crisis, 18 protestors were shot dead by the police.

Economy
Juliaca is a large trade center for goods and services, and is considered the financial capital of the Puno region. Trade is its principal economic activity, comprising 26.5% of the Labor force. In 2008, Juliaca had 15,439 commercial establishments, which amounts to 41% of trade done in the Puno region. It is the commercial hub for the La Rinconada high-altitude city of informal gold mining.

The city of Juliaca has become a center of capital investment. As a result, poverty has been reduced, and increased per capita income has come to some of its residents.

Geography

Climate
Juliaca has a subtropical highland climate (Köppen Cwb/Cwc) bordering on an alpine tundra climate (ETH) with cool to cold temperatures most of the year. Winters are dry with freezing nights and mornings, and pleasant afternoon temperatures.

Monuments and places of interest 
The city of Juliaca and its surroundings have various natural and historical tourist attractions, among the most outstanding are:  The Santa Catalina church, Waynaruqi hill, Chacas lagoon and the Kokan community.

Santa Catalina Church 
Located in the Plaza de Armas, it has an indigenous baroque architectural style. The start of its construction dates back to 1649, started by the Jesuits; however it was not completed until 125 years later. Proof of this is its only bell tower, built entirely with ashlar brought from the quarries of Arequipa. It is currently under the command of the Franciscan Order.

La Merced Church 
This church is a beautiful work of architecture from the time of the republic. It is located in the west wing of the Plaza Bolognesi in the city center. Carved out of red limestone (due to its characteristic color) and with a structure typical of the modern era (iron frame). Like the main Church of Santa Catalina, it only has a bell tower arranged symmetrically unlike the previous one, and it also features a clock with four circular faces. Its construction is due to a group of faithful devotees who commissioned the construction from Don Gregorio Layme. It was inaugurated in 1959 and renovated in 1995, where they included indigenous elements.

Franciscan Convent 
Also called Convent of  Santa Bárbara . It is a four-level building built on the hill  Hatun Rumi  or  Santa Bárbara  (Spanish name), 40 m from the Plaza de Armas de Juliaca, it presents a style essentially Romanesque

Due to its importance during the republican era, today it constitutes one of the main tourist attractions of the city.

Waynaruqi hill 
Located in a southeast of the Plaza de Armas, on the top of the hill Waynaruqi. The White Christ, made entirely in concrete and fiberglass, stands out on the horizon of Juliaca. At the foot of the monument is a viewpoint, from which it is possible to see the urban and non-urban areas that comprise the city. The complex was built in just two and a half weeks, and was opened in 1987.

Las Calceteras Gallery 
It is a three-floor building, located in the north wing of the Plaza Bolognesi. It is a shopping center for handicrafts, where all kinds of clothing are sold (socks, chullos, bootees, shawls, sweaters, rugs, gloves, etc.) woven or manufactured with native materials (llama, alpaca, vicuña ), the visitor can also visualize the handwork done by the artisan ladies with their typical clothing (called hosiery), in different types of wool and fiber, highly appreciated in the international market.

Chacas Lagoon 
Located 10 km northwest of the city of Juliaca, in the area corresponding to the towns of Kokan and Chacas. It is a lagoon surrounded by vast hills, like the Iquinito (which is the highest in the area), the lagoon has a fusiform shape and an area of approximately 6.2 km  2 . In this abundant lagoon the local flora and fauna, mainly during the summer (rainy season).

Gallery

See also
Colegio Parroquial Franciscano San Román
PeruRail

References

External links

Cities in Peru
Populated places in the Puno Region